Deh-e Now Molla Esmail (also Romanized as Deh-e Now Mollā Esmā‘īl and Deh Now-e Mollā Esmā‘īl) is a village in Jolgeh Rural District, in the Central District of Behabad County, Yazd Province, Iran. At the 2006 census, its population was 148, in 38 families.

References 

Populated places in Behabad County